Garciasville is a census-designated place (CDP) in Starr County, Texas, United States. It is a new CDP for 2010 census with a population of 46.

Geography
Garciasville is located at  (26.319777, -98.699621).

Education
It is in the Rio Grande City Grulla Independent School District (formerly Rio Grande City Consolidated Independent School District)

References

Census-designated places in Starr County, Texas
Census-designated places in Texas